In snakes, the subcaudal scales are the enlarged plates on the underside of the tail. These scales may be either single or divided (paired) and are preceded by the anal scale.

Related scales
 Anal scale
 Ventral scales

See also
 Snake scales

References

Snake scales